Tousse Running Apparel is an American supplier of custom uniforms for track and field, which produces track suits, speedsuits, shorts and shirts for teams. It was founded in 1987 by Olympic Silver Medalist Cheryl Toussaint. The uniforms are licensed and manufactured by GK Elite Sportswear in Reading, Pennsylvania.

See also

Sportswear (activewear)

References

External links
 Tousse Running Apparel
 GK Elite Sportswear homepage

Sport of athletics equipment
Sportswear